Grästorp Municipality (Grästorps kommun) is a  municipality in Västra Götaland County in western Sweden. Its seat is located in the town of Grästorp.

Grästorp Municipality is located right in the middle of Västra Götaland County, by the shores of Lake Vänern.

History

In the year 1900 the village Grästorp was detached from Tengene and made a market town (köping). The local government reform of 1952 amalgamated it with twelve surrounding municipalities (among them Tengene). The 1971 reform made the term köping obsolete, thus forming Grästorps kommun without amendment of territory.

The area has been inhabited at least since the Viking Age as it contains several runestones. The runestone at the church at Sal has an inscription that reads "Torgård satte denna sten efter Toke, sin frände", meaning "Torgård raised this stone for Toke, his kinsman".

Localities
The seat Grästorp (pop. 3,000) is the only built-up locality with more than 200 inhabitants in this predominantly rural area.

Government and politics
In the 2010 elections the white nationalist Party of the Swedes got 102 votes or 2.8 per cent in the elections to the council, giving them one seat and making them the first white nationalist party to get any mandate in a Swedish political assembly since the 1940s.

Distribution of the 31 seats in the municipal council after the 2010 election:

Moderate Party   11
Social Democratic Party   9
Centre Party   6
Liberal People's Party   3
Party of the Swedes   1
Sweden Democrats   1

Results of the 2010 Swedish general election in Grästorp:

Moderate Party   31.6%
Social Democratic Party   30.5%
Centre Party   14.1%
Sweden Democrats   6.3%
Liberal People's Party   5.2%
Christian Democrats   4.2%
Green Party   3.6%
Left Party   3.5%

References

External links

Grästorp Municipality - Official site

Municipalities of Västra Götaland County
Skaraborg